Ángel David Zerpa (born September 27, 1999) is a Venezuelan professional baseball pitcher for the Kansas City Royals of Major League Baseball (MLB). He made his MLB debut in 2021.

Career
Zerpa signed with the Kansas City Royals as an international free agent in 2016 for a $100,000 signing bonus. Zerpa made his professional debut in 2017 with the Dominican Summer League Royals, going 3–4 with a 1.84 ERA and 39 strikeouts over  innings. He spent the 2018 season with the Arizona League Royals, going 3–6 with a 3.88 ERA and 34 strikeouts over  innings. Zerpa split the 2019 season between the Burlington Royals and the Idaho Falls Chukars, going a combined 6–3 with a 3.40 ERA and 55 strikeouts over  innings. He did not play in 2020 due to the cancellation of the Minor League Baseball season because of the COVID-19 pandemic.

On November 20, 2020, Zerpa was added to the Royals 40–man roster. Zerpa split the 2021 minor league season between the Quad Cities River Bandits, the Northwest Arkansas Naturals, and the Omaha Storm Chasers, going a combined 4–4 with a 4.58 ERA and 108 strikeouts over  innings.

On September 30, 2021, Zerpa was recalled to the active roster to make his MLB debut as the starting pitcher versus the Cleveland Indians.

In 2022, Zerpa made 3 appearances (2 starts) for the Royals, logging a 2-1 record and 1.64 ERA with 3 strikeouts in 11.0 innings pitched. In 19 starts split between Northwest Arkansas and Omaha, Zerpa posted a 2-5 record and 4.02 ERA with 69 strikeouts in 71.2 innings of work.

On March 15, 2023, Zerpa was placed on the 60-day injured list with left shoulder tendinopathy.

References

External links

1999 births
Living people
People from Valle de la Pascua
Major League Baseball players from Venezuela
Major League Baseball pitchers
Kansas City Royals players
Dominican Summer League Royals players
Arizona League Royals players
Burlington Royals players
Idaho Falls Chukars players
Quad Cities River Bandits players
Northwest Arkansas Naturals players
Omaha Storm Chasers players
Venezuelan expatriate baseball players in the Dominican Republic
Venezuelan expatriate baseball players in the United States